In the 2012–13 season, MC El Eulma is competing in the Ligue 1 for the 5th season, as well as the Algerian Cup.  It is their 5th consecutive season in the top flight of Algerian football. They will be competing in Ligue 1, and the Algerian Cup.

Squad list
Players and squad numbers last updated on 18 November 2012.Note: Flags indicate national team as has been defined under FIFA eligibility rules. Players may hold more than one non-FIFA nationality.

Competitions

Overview

{| class="wikitable" style="text-align: center"
|-
!rowspan=2|Competition
!colspan=8|Record
!rowspan=2|Started round
!rowspan=2|Final position / round
!rowspan=2|First match	
!rowspan=2|Last match
|-
!
!
!
!
!
!
!
!
|-
| Ligue 1

|  
| 8th
| 15 September 2012
| 21 May 2013
|-
| Algerian Cup

| Round of 64 
| Round of 32
| 14 December 2012
| 29 December 2012
|-
! Total

Ligue 1

League table

Results summary

Results by round

Matches

Algerian Cup

Squad information

Playing statistics

|-
! colspan=10 style=background:#dcdcdc; text-align:center| Goalkeepers

|-
! colspan=10 style=background:#dcdcdc; text-align:center| Defenders

|-
! colspan=10 style=background:#dcdcdc; text-align:center| Midfielders

|-
! colspan=10 style=background:#dcdcdc; text-align:center| Forwards

|-
! colspan=10 style=background:#dcdcdc; text-align:center| Players transferred out during the season

Goalscorers

Transfers

In

Out

References

External links
 2012–13 MC El Eulma season at dzfoot.com 

MC El Eulma seasons
Algerian football clubs 2012–13 season